Sarah Ruth Snook (born 1 December 1987) is an Australian actress. She is known for her starring role as Shiv Roy in the television series Succession (2018–present), for which she earned critical acclaim in international media. She has won several awards including a Golden Globe Award, a Screen Actors Guild Award and a Critics' Choice Television Award, with nominations for two Primetime Emmy Awards.

Among other films, Snook has appeared in Not Suitable for Children (2012), These Final Hours (2013), Predestination (2014), The Dressmaker (2015), Steve Jobs (2015), The Glass Castle (2017), and Pieces of a Woman (2020). She won two AACTA Awards for her leading roles in Sisters of War (2010) and Predestination (2014).

Early life
Sarah Ruth Snook was born in Adelaide, South Australia, and grew up in the suburb of Eden Hills. She has two older sisters. Her father, a swimming-pool salesman, and her mother, an aged care provider, divorced when she was young. She attended St John's Grammar School in Belair and won a drama scholarship to Scotch College in Torrens Park. Her first paying job was as a fairy at children's birthday parties.

In 2008 she graduated from Sydney's National Institute of Dramatic Art.

Career 

While at NIDA, Snook performed in stage productions of Macbeth and Gallipoli. She subsequently appeared in King Lear with the State Theatre Company of South Australia and as Saint Joan in the Sydney Theatre Company's production in 2018.

She has starred in the films Not Suitable for Children (2012), These Final Hours (2013), Predestination (2014), and Jessabelle (2014). Currently, Snook plays a lead role in the HBO series Succession, as Siobhan "Shiv" Roy.

In December 2021, she replaced Elisabeth Moss as the lead in the horror-thriller film Run Rabbit Run directed by Daina Reid. In January 2022, Snook was cast in a multi-starrer film The Beanie Bubble co-directed by Kristin Gore and Damian Kulash. 

In 2022 Snook narrated the Netflix documentary Kangaroo Valley.

Personal life
In 2020, Snook began dating Australian comedian Dave Lawson. They married in 2021, in the backyard of Snook's Brooklyn home.

Filmography

Film

Television

Awards and nominations

References

External links

 

Australian film actresses
Australian television actresses
Actresses from Adelaide
1987 births
Living people
National Institute of Dramatic Art alumni
People educated at Scotch College, Adelaide
Best Actress AACTA Award winners
21st-century Australian actresses